Chads is a surname. Notable people with the surname include:

John Cornell Chads (1793–1854), Royal Marines officer and President of the British Virgin Islands
Henry Ducie Chads (1788–1868), British admiral
Henry Chads (1819–1906), British admiral and son of Henry Ducie Chads

See also
Chad (surname)